Christelle Tchoudjang Nana (born ) is a Cameroonian volleyball player.

She is a member of the Cameroon women's national volleyball team and played for VBC Chamalières in 2014. She was part of the Cameroonian national team at the 2014 FIVB Volleyball Women's World Championship in Italy.

Clubs
  VBC Chamalières (2014)

References

External links
http://rio2016.fivb.com/en/volleyball/women/teams/cmr-cameroon/players/christelle-tchoudjang-nana?id=53662
http://italy2014.fivb.org/en/competition/teams/cmr-cameroon/players/christelle-tchoudjang-nana?id=41064
http://www.camer-sport.be/4460/4/CM/20/cameroun-christelle-nana-tchoudjang-impariale-capitaine-cameroon.html
https://web.archive.org/web/20180404201941/http://www.transafricaradio.net/index.php/2016/08/04/athletes-watch-rio-christelle-nana-tchoudjang-volleyball-cameroon/
http://www.chicagotribune.com/ct-rio-olympics-nail-polish-patriotism-2016081-013-photo.html
http://www.worldofvolley.com/wov-community/players/17619/christelle-nana-tchoudjang.html

Cameroonian women's volleyball players
Place of birth missing (living people)
Olympic volleyball players of Cameroon
Volleyball players at the 2016 Summer Olympics
1989 births
Living people
Opposite hitters
Expatriate volleyball players in France
Cameroonian expatriate sportspeople
Cameroonian expatriates in France